The 1995 Swedish Open was a men's tennis tournament played on outdoor clay courts. It was the 48th edition of the Swedish Open, and part of the World Series of the 1995 ATP Tour. It took place between 10 July and 16 July 1995, in Båstad, Sweden. Unseeded Fernando Meligeni won the singles title.

Singles main draw entrants

Seeds 

1 Rankings as of 3 July 1995.

Other entrants 
The following players received wildcards into the main draw:
 Christian Bergstrom
 Magnus Gustafsson
 Mikael Pernfors

The following players received entry from the qualifying draw:
 David Engel 
 Lars-Anders Wahlgren
 Magnus Norman
 Patrik Fredriksson

Doubles main draw entrants

Seeds 

1 Rankings are as of 3 July 1995.

Finals

Singles 

  Fernando Meligeni defeated  Christian Ruud, 6–4, 6–4

Doubles 

  Jan Apell /  Jonas Björkman defeated  Jon Ireland /  Andrew Kratzmann, 6–3, 6–0

References

External links
 Official website
 ITF tournament edition details

Swedish Open
Swedish Open
1995 in Swedish tennis
July 1995 sports events in Europe
Swed